Luis Flores Abarca (born 3 May 1982) is a Chilean retired footballer.

Career and Ñublense

Luis Flores started his career the 2000, with 18 years in Palestino, and has played in many teams, like Palestino, O'higgins and Antofagasta, but in 2007 he transferred to Ñublense. He is a very fast forward, and he has a very good control of the ball. He currently has a score of 17 goals in Ñublense, 7 in Apertura 2007, 2 in Clausura 2007, and 8 in Apertura 2008.

International goals
Scores and results list Chile's goal tally first.

References

External links

1982 births
Living people
Chilean footballers
Chile international footballers
Chilean Primera División players
Primera B de Chile players
O'Higgins F.C. footballers
C.D. Antofagasta footballers
Everton de Viña del Mar footballers
Magallanes footballers
Curicó Unido footballers
Club Deportivo Palestino footballers
Ñublense footballers
Association football forwards